Marie Elizabeth Rimmer,  (born 27 April 1947) is a British Labour Party politician. She has previously been a local councillor for St Helens Metropolitan Borough Council in Merseyside, England, and has served as Labour leader of the council three times between 1978 and 2014. She has recently been the Member of Parliament (MP) for St Helens South and Whiston since 2015.

Early life 
Born in 1947, Rimmer grew up in St Helens. After she left school, she worked at the Pilkington Glass manufacturing plant, first as a comptometer operator, and later as a buyer for the engineering division.

Councillor career (1978-2014) 
Rimmer first became a Labour local councillor for St Helens in 1978. In 1985, Rimmer became Labour leader of the council. In 1986, Rimmer debated against the unfriendly take-over bid from BTR Industries, arguing that the loss of local control of the company would greatly harm St Helens. BTR withdrew its offer the same year. In 1993, Rimmer stepped down as Labour leader of the council and returned to Pilkington Glass as a health and safety advisor, until retiring from the position following the 1999 St Helens Metropolitan Borough Council election, where she became Labour leader of the council for the second time.

In the 2004 St Helens Metropolitan Borough Council election, Rimmer held her seat in West Park after 3 recounts, however the Labour council lost its majority and lost overall control of the council to no overall control. In the same year, Rimmer was a board member of the Northwest Development Agency (NWDA), a regional development agency for the North West England. In July, Rimmer and the St Helens Council backed the plans for the construction for a new stadium for St Helens R.F.C. as part of a £100m leisure complex. She was appointed Commander of the Order of the British Empire (CBE) in the 2005 Birthday Honours for services to local government.

In 2006, police investigated Rimmer for allegations that she had spend £1,000 more than what was allowed in her ward during May's local elections, breaking rules governing election campaign expenses. The original complaints originated from a member of the now defunct Community Action Party, Eric Guest, who was hit back by the Labour Party who called the allegations 'spurious and malicious.'

Rimmer became leader of the council for a third time following the 2010 St Helens Metropolitan Borough Council election. She criticised the then outgoing administration, led by Liberal Democrats leader Brian Spencer, for driving people away from the town centre after their implementation of car parking charges in some areas of St Helens. In 2011, Rimmer opposed plans to introduce the Metro Mayor of the Liverpool City Region, stating that "St Helens has a long and proud tradition of helping to support the sub region economy by working closely with our colleagues. I do not believe that investing power in one individual is the right thing to do."

Her leadership ended following the 2014 St Helens Metropolitan Borough Council election where despite winning a large Labour majority, Rimmer was replaced by her deputy, Barrie Grunewald, in May 2013 after a 22 to 18 vote of the Labour group on the council.

Parliamentary career (2014-present) 
In 2014, Rimmer was picked from an all-women shortlist as Labour's candidate in the 2015 general election to succeed Shaun Woodward as MP for St Helens South and Whiston. Thirteen years prior, she was blocked from being shortlisted for the same seat ahead of the 2001 general election by Labour's national executive committee, amidst accusations of a "stitch-up" to parachute Woodward into the seat, as he was unlikely to win his Witney seat which he won in 1997 as a Conservative. Labour officials refused to disclose reasons why Rimmer was excluded from the shortlist, and despite being noted as a local favourite, Rimmer insisted that, despite her exclusion, she was not angry and that she "...did not come into politics to be angry." She was elected as MP for St Helens South and Whiston in the 2015 general election with a majority of 21,243.

On the day of the Scottish independence referendum in 2014, an incident at a polling station in Shettleston, Glasgow, led to her arrest and being charged with assault. Rimmer's case was later found not proven at Glasgow Sheriff Court in November 2016.

Initially supporting Yvette Cooper, she supported Owen Smith in the 2016 Labour leadership election. In the 2016 United Kingdom European Union membership referendum, Rimmer voted remain. Following the murder of Jo Cox, Rimmer was among 20 MP's, and musicians including Ricky Wilson, MP4, and Royal Opera House Thurrock Community Chorus, to record a charity single covering The Rolling Stones' You Can't Always Get What You Want.

In the 2017 general election, Rimmer held her seat and increased her majority to 24,343.

Rimmer was appointed Shadow Minister for Disabled People on 1 February 2017 but decided to step down from the role in October the same year. On 14 April 2020, she was appointed as an opposition whip.

Rimmer endorsed Keir Starmer in the 2020 Labour Party leadership election.

Personal life 
Rimmer has a sister, Marlene Mary Quinn, who also ran as councillor in St Helens as recently as 2019.

References

External links 

1947 births
Commanders of the Order of the British Empire
Female members of the Parliament of the United Kingdom for English constituencies
Labour Party (UK) MPs for English constituencies
Living people
UK MPs 2015–2017
21st-century British women politicians
UK MPs 2017–2019
UK MPs 2019–present
21st-century English women
21st-century English people